Sarsuna Law College is a private law college in Sarsuna, Kolkata, West Bengal. It was established in the year 2004. The college is affiliated to Bankura University. This college is also approved by the Bar Council of India.

Courses 
The college offers three-year LL.B. course and two year LL.M. course

See also

References

External links 
 http://sarsunalawcollege.org/index.asp

Law schools in West Bengal
Universities and colleges in Kolkata
Colleges affiliated to Bankura University
Educational institutions established in 2004
2004 establishments in West Bengal